Roy William Kurrasch (October 8, 1922 – July 11, 2015) was an American football end in the National Football League for the Pittsburgh Steelers. He was born in Toledo, Ohio. He also played in the All-America Football Conference for the New York Yankees.  Kurrasch played college football at the University of California, Los Angeles and was drafted in the ninth round of the 1947 NFL Draft for the Washington Redskins. Kurrasch died in July 2015 at the age of 92.

References

1922 births
2015 deaths
Sportspeople from Toledo, Ohio
American football wide receivers
UCLA Bruins football players
New York Yankees (AAFC) players
Pittsburgh Steelers players